Mara Allen (born February 11, 1987) is an American rower. In the 2009 World Rowing Championships, she won a gold medal in the women's eight event.

In the 2010 World Rowing Championships, she also won a bronze medal in the women's four event.

References

External links
 

1987 births
Living people
American female rowers
World Rowing Championships medalists for the United States
21st-century American women